Lometa is a city in Lampasas County, Texas, United States. The population was 856 at the 2010 census. It is part of the Killeen–Temple–Fort Hood metropolitan statistical area.

Geography

Lometa is located at  (31.218129, –98.392916).

History

The name Lometa originates from a Native American word meaning "Little hill"
Lomita is Spanish for little hill

Events
The annual festivals in Lometa are a spring Diamondback Jubilee, an annual livestock show, and a summer junior rodeo.

Lometa has one traffic light, a recent improvement as of 2003 from the original four-way stop, in the middle of town. On the edge of town is a municipal park with camping sites and a rodeo arena and grounds.

Lometa was a  site platted May 17, 1886, as a railroad stop.  The town was rapidly transferred out of the nearby stagecoach stop of Senterfitt. The town had originally been called Montvale, but a change was made in 1886 when an application for a post office was made.

By 1890, the population included 150 Lometans, and four years later, the town got its first newspaper. Another weekly paper was published in 1896, and a third by 1900.

Demographics

2020 census

As of the 2020 United States census, there were 753 people, 154 households, and 100 families residing in the city.

2000 census
As of the census of 2000, 782 people, 291 households, and 190 families resided in the city. The population density was 866.6 people/sq mi (335.5/km). The 339 housing units averaged 375.7/sq mi (145.4/km). The racial makeup of the city was 83.12% White, 2.30% African American, 1.02% Native American, 0.13% Asian, 11.51% from other races, and 1.92% from two or more races. Hispanics or Latinos of any race were 29.80% of the population.

Of the 291 households, 28.2% had children under 18 living with them, 46.7% were married couples living together, 10.7% had a female householder with no husband present, and 34.7% were not families. About 31.3% of all households were made up of individuals, and 21.0% had someone living alone who was 65 years of age or older. The average household size was 2.52 and the average family size was 3.14.

In the city, the age distribution was 33.5% under the age of 18, 7.5% from 18 to 24, 19.7% from 25 to 44, 23.4% from 45 to 64, and 15.9% who were 65 years of age or older. The median age was 34 years. For every 100 females, there were 102.1 males. For every 100 females age 18 and over, there were 94.0 males.

The median income for a household in the city was $21,923, and for a family was $28,125. Males had a median income of $27,917 versus $16,538 for females. The per capita income for the city was $10,428. About 19.3% of families and 29.1% of the population were below the poverty line, including 38.3% of those under age 18 and 18.8% of those age 65 or over.

Transportation

Lometa is served by two major highways, U.S. Routes 183 and 190. Two railroads are located in Lometa, BNSF Railway (previously the Santa Fe Railway) and the Heart of Texas Railroad (previously the Santa Fe Railway's) branch to Brady, Texas. Until July 1968, Lometa was a night flag stop on the Santa Fe passenger train the California Special that ran from Clovis, New Mexico to Houston.

Education
Lometa has one primary education facility covering prekindergarten through 12th grade. The school is a part of the Lometa Independent School District and the mascot is the fighting hornet; the school colors are maroon and gold.

Climate
The climate in this area is characterized by hot, humid summers and generally mild to cool winters.  According to the Köppen climate classification, Lometa has a humid subtropical climate, Cfa.

References

 The Handbook of Texas:  https://tshaonline.org/handbook/online/articles/hll55
 Jonnie Ross Elzner, Relighting Lamplights of Lampasas County, Texas (Lampasas: Hill Country, 1974)
 Scott Hightower: Tin Can Tourist, Natural Trouble, Part of the Bargain

External links
 
 Photojournalism essay

Cities in Texas
Cities in Lampasas County, Texas
Killeen–Temple–Fort Hood metropolitan area